Jason Lee Trinder (born 3 March 1970) is an English former professional footballer who played in the Football League for Mansfield Town.

References

3. https://www.linkedin.com/mwlite/in/jason-trinder-32563025

1970 births
Living people
English footballers
Association football goalkeepers
English Football League players
Mansfield Town F.C. players
Oadby Town F.C. players
Grimsby Town F.C. players
Matlock Town F.C. players
Rugby Town F.C. players
Aberaman Athletic F.C. players
Cardiff Grange Harlequins A.F.C. players
Cardiff Corinthians F.C. players